Blue Beetle is an upcoming American superhero film based on the DC Comics character Jaime Reyes / Blue Beetle. It is intended to be the 14th film in the DC Extended Universe (DCEU). The film is directed by Angel Manuel Soto from a screenplay by Gareth Dunnet-Alcocer, and stars Xolo Maridueña as Reyes alongside Bruna Marquezine, Belissa Escobedo, George Lopez, Adriana Barraza, Elpidia Carrillo, Damián Alcázar, Raoul Trujillo, and Susan Sarandon. It is produced by DC Studios, Entertainment One, S&K Pictures, and the Safran Company, and set for distribution by Warner Bros. Pictures.

Development of a film featuring Reyes began by the end of November 2018 with Dunnet-Alcocer attached. Soto was hired to direct the film in February 2021 for the streaming service HBO Max. Maridueña was cast that August, and the film was changed to have a theatrical release in December. Further casting took place in early 2022, before filming took place from late May to mid-July in the Atlanta metropolitan area at Wilder Studios in Decatur, Georgia, as well as in El Paso, Texas and Puerto Rico.

Blue Beetle is scheduled to be released in the United States on August 18, 2023.

Cast 
 Xolo Maridueña as Jaime Reyes / Blue Beetle: A teenager who gains superpowers when an alien Blue Beetle scarab grafts onto him, forming a powerful exoskeleton around his body.
 Bruna Marquezine as Penny: Jaime's love interest.
 Belissa Escobedo as Milagros Reyes: Jaime's younger sister.
 George Lopez as Rudy: Jaime's uncle.
 Adriana Barraza as Nana
 Elpidia Carrillo as Rocio
 Damián Alcázar as Alberto
 Raoul Trujillo as Carapax the Indestructible Man
 Susan Sarandon as Victoria Kord

Additionally, Harvey Guillén has been cast in an undisclosed role.

Production

Development 
Warner Bros. Pictures and DC Films were developing a film based on Jaime Reyes / Blue Beetle by the end of November 2018, with Mexican-born Gareth Dunnet-Alcocer writing the screenplay. Zev Foreman was executive producing the project for Warner Bros., which was set to be the first DC Extended Universe (DCEU) film starring a Latino lead. By December 2020, DC Films was planning to release several mid-budget films a year exclusively on the streaming service HBO Max, rather than in theaters, as part of new DC Films president Walter Hamada's plan for the DCEU, with Blue Beetle listed as one such project in 2021. Puerto Rican Angel Manuel Soto was hired to direct the film in February 2021. In April, Blue Beetle was included on DC's slate of films that were expected to be released in 2022 or 2023. John Rickard was producing the film for HBO Max by that August, when filming was expected to begin in early 2022. In December 2021, Warner Bros. revealed that the film would be receiving a theatrical release in August 2023 instead of being produced directly for HBO Max. In mid-April 2022, Soto and cinematographer Pawel Pogorzelski visited El Paso, Texas, to meet with local artists, muralists, musicians, and historians to understand the feel of the city. Peter Safran also serves as a producer. Entertainment One, S&K Pictures, and the Safran Company co-produce the film, alongside DC Studios. In January 2023, newly-appointed DC Studios CEO James Gunn stated that the film would be "disconnected" from previous DCEU entries and could be retconned into being part of the new DC Universe.

Writing 
In October 2021, Soto said Dunnet-Alcocer's script featured "the Latino family at its core", while star Xolo Maridueña said in August 2022 that the family aspect of the film and character were "inherent to the comics" and felt had not been explored as much with other superhero films. Fellow star Susan Sarandon revealed the following month that the film would have several scenes spoken in Spanish, with subtitles being provided. The final writing credits were given to Dunnet-Alcocer, with off-screen additional literary credit given to Gary Dauberman.

Casting 
Xolo Maridueña was Soto's first choice to portray Reyes, with Soto explaining that he "couldn't stop seeing [Maridueña] as the character" since he was hired to direct the film. Soto and Warner Bros. offered the role to Maridueña on August 1, 2021, he was publicly revealed to be in talks for the film the next day, and his casting was officially confirmed later that day at the premiere for the DCEU film The Suicide Squad. When learning of the role, Maridueña was most excited that Reyes is a Latino character and he could bring Latino representation to a superhero project.

In early March, Bruna Marquezine was cast as Reyes's love interest, Penny, with Belissa Escobedo playing Reyes's sister Milagros, and Harvey Guillén cast in an undisclosed role. Later that month, the rest of Reyes's family was cast: George Lopez as uncle Rudy, Adriana Barraza as Nana, Elpidia Carrillo as Rocio, and Damián Alcázar as Alberto. Soto said he wanted to create an authentic Mexican family with real accents and experiences, and also wanted the elder members of the family to be portrayed by "beloved" Mexican actors from Latin American cinema who had also crossed over to United States cinema and paved the way for members of the younger generation, such as Maridueña and Escobedo. By the end of March, Sharon Stone was in talks to play the villain Victoria Kord, an original creation for the film which was believed to be the wife of Ted Kord, the second Blue Beetle in the comics. Raoul Trujillo also joined the cast then as Carapax the Indestructible Man. In mid-April, Susan Sarandon was cast as Victoria Kord after negotiations with Stone ended.

Filming 
Principal photography began by May 25, 2022, taking place in the Atlanta metropolitan area, primarily at Wilder Studios in Decatur, Georgia, using the working title Mofongo. Pawel Pogorzelski served as the cinematographer. Filming also occurred in El Paso and Puerto Rico. Sarandon completed filming her scenes by the end of June, and Trujillo said in early July that filming was almost complete. Filming wrapped on July 18 in Puerto Rico.

Marketing 
Soto, Dunnet-Alcocer, and Maridueña promoted the film at the virtual DC FanDome event in October 2021, where they discussed their preparation for filming and revealed concept art for the film.

Release 
Blue Beetle is scheduled for theatrical release in the United States on August 18, 2023. A screening in El Paso is also planned. It was originally intended to be an HBO Max exclusive original streaming film.

References

External links 
 

2020s American films
2020s English-language films
2020s Spanish-language films
2023 action films
2023 films
American coming-of-age films
American science fiction films
American superhero films
DC Extended Universe films
Entertainment One films
Films about Mexican Americans
Films produced by Peter Safran
Films set in Texas
Films shot in Atlanta
Films shot in El Paso, Texas
Films shot in Puerto Rico
Live-action films based on DC Comics
Teen superhero films
Upcoming films
Warner Bros. films
Upcoming English-language films
Upcoming Spanish-language films